Daphnis moorei is a moth of the family Sphingidae first described by William John Macleay in 1866. It is known from Indonesia (including the Moluccas), Papua New Guinea and the northern half of Australia.

The forewing upperside is similar to Daphnis hypothous.

References

Daphnis (moth)
Moths described in 1866